El cielo es para todos (English: Heaven is for all) is a Mexican telenovela produced by Valentín Pimstein for Televisa in 1979.

Is an adaptation of the Argentine telenovela El cielo es para todos produced in 1962. That in turn is based on the telenovela San Martín de Porres produced in 1964.

Cast 
René Múñoz as San Martín de Porres
Diana Torres 
Pancho Córdova 
Julieta Egurrola 
Mónica Sánchez Navarro 
Alma Delfina
Carlos Cámara
Arturo Rios 
Ivonne Govea 
Virginia Gutiérrez

References

External links 

Mexican telenovelas
1979 telenovelas
Televisa telenovelas
Spanish-language telenovelas
1979 Mexican television series debuts
1979 Mexican television series endings